Syed Ali Musa Gillani is a Pakistani politician who is member of the National Assembly of Pakistan Since Elected on 16th October 2022. Previously He Served as Member of National Assembly of Pakistan Since 2012 to 2013. He contested the general election of 2013 and 2018 from PPP ticket. He is an active political worker, writer and a polo player. 
He is the son of former prime minister of Pakistan Syed Yousaf Raza Gillani.

Political career
He was elected to the National Assembly of Pakistan from Constituency NA-148 (Multan-I) as a candidate of Pakistan Peoples Party (PPP) in by-polls held in February 2012. He received 93,106 votes and defeated Malik Abdul Gafar Dogar.

He ran for the seat of the National Assembly from Constituency NA-148 (Multan-I) as a candidate of PPP in 2013 Pakistani general election, but was unsuccessful. He received 49,918 votes and lost the seat to Malik Abdul Gafar Dogar.
He ran for the election on NA 157 in 2018 general elections and secured 72,000 votes.
He was arrested on 25 November 2020 in Multan.Police arrested him over organising a rally without seek permission from the government. but later released on bail.

References

Living people
Pakistani MNAs 2008–2013
Year of birth missing (living people)